The Witenalpstock is a mountain of the Glarus Alps, located on the border between the Swiss cantons of Uri and Graubünden. It lies west of the Oberalpstock, between the Etzlital and the Val Strem.

References

External links
 Witenalpstock on Hikr

Mountains of the Alps
Alpine three-thousanders
Mountains of Graubünden
Mountains of the canton of Uri
Graubünden–Uri border
Mountains of Switzerland
Tujetsch